Scopula tessellaria, the dusky-brown wave,  is a moth of the  family Geometridae. It is found in Belgium, Luxembourg, France, Germany, Italy, Spain, Albania, former Yugoslavia, Croatia, Bulgaria, Romania, North Macedonia, Greece, Moldova, Ukraine and Russia. In the east, the range extends to the Near East and the eastern part of the Palaearctic realm.

The larvae are polyphagous and have been recorded feeding on various low-growing plants, including Origanum  species.

Subspecies
Scopula tessellaria tessellaria
Scopula tessellaria proutiana Sheljuzhko, 1955

Taxonomy
Scopula tessellaria guillaumei was described from the Alps of southern France, however, further research has shown that it is just an altitudinal form.

References

Moths described in 1840
tessellaria
Moths of Europe
Moths of Asia
Taxa named by Jean Baptiste Boisduval